Martin Fischer (1867–1947) was a Swiss automobile designer who built cars under Turicum and Fischer names. He began his career as a watchmaker. Some of his cars still survive.

References 

1867 births
1947 deaths
Swiss engineers